Corey Dowden (born October 18, 1968) is an American former defensive back in the National Football League.

Biography
Dowden was born on October 18, 1968 in New Orleans, Louisiana.

Career
Dowden's first professional experience was in two seasons with the Tampa Bay Storm of the Arena Football League. He was named Second-team All-Arena in 1995. He then spent a season with the Ottawa Rough Riders of the Canadian Football League before returning to the Storm for another season. During the 1996 NFL season Dowden played with two teams: First, with the Green Bay Packers and later that season he joined the Baltimore Ravens. He spent the 1997 NFL season with the Chicago Bears before returning to the Storm for one final season.

He played at the collegiate level at Tulane University.

See also
List of Green Bay Packers players

References

Players of American football from New Orleans
Baltimore Ravens players
Green Bay Packers players
Chicago Bears players
Tampa Bay Storm players
Ottawa Rough Riders players
American football defensive backs
Tulane University alumni
Tulane Green Wave football players
Living people
1968 births
New Jersey Gladiators players